Aidan Dunne is a visual arts critic and contributor to The Irish Times.

Education 
Dunne is a graduate of the National College of Art and Design, Dublin.

Career 
Aidan Dunne has written regularly for The Irish Times for decades.  He was art critic of In Dublin magazine, Sunday Press and the Sunday Tribune.  Dunne has written extensively on Irish art, with essays on Michael Mulcahy, Victor Sloan, Patrick Scott, Hughie O'Donoghue, Patrick Swift, and Jennifer Trouton.  He has also written an essay on Russian photographer and artist Alexey Titarenko.

Bibliography
Patrick Scott, published by Liberties Press in 2008;  2010- ;

References

Year of birth missing (living people)
Living people
Irish art critics
Sunday Tribune people
The Irish Times people
Alumni of the National College of Art and Design